The Love and War Tour is debut concert tour by American recording artist Tamar Braxton. The tour supports Braxton's second studio album,  Love And War (2013). The two-month tour started on May 16, playing 20 shows in North America.

Background
Following the release of her album, Braxton announced she would start a tour in the spring. Dates were officially released on March 28, 2014, with the tour beginning May 16, in Miami Beach. 

Before the tour commenced, Braxton supported John Legend on his fall 2013 tour. From that experience, she stated: "When it comes to touring, you have to be very professional. People pay to come see you. You can't keep them waiting. That's very rude. And another thing John taught me the most is to be more organized. If not, you're a mess. And trust me, ain't nobody got time for that." Braxton would later tour with R. Kelly in 2014.

Setlist
The following setlist was obtained from the concert held on May 16, 2014; at The Fillmore Miami Beach in Miami Beach, Florida. It does not represent all concerts for the duration of the tour.
"Instrumental Sequence" 
"The One"
"Tip Toe"
"Pieces"
"Watchin' Me (Yep, I Know It)"
"Stay and Fight"
"Where It Hurts"
"Sound of Love"
"Dance Sequence" 
"One on One Fun"
"Hot Sugar"
"All the Way Home"
"Love and War"

Tour dates

Cancellations and rescheduled shows

Box office score data

External links
Tamar Braxton Official Website

References

Tamar Braxton
Tamar Braxton concert tours
2014 concert tours